This is a list of species in the plant genus Viola, often known as violets or pansies.

Viola is the largest genus in the family Violaceae, containing between 525 and 600 species.

Streptocarpus sect. Saintpaulia (African violets) and Erythronium dens-canis (dogtooth violet) are not closely related to the true violas.

List

Species include:

Hybrids
Known hybrids in genus Viola include:

References

Viola